In computer software, the term parameter validation is the automated processing, in a module, to validate the spelling or accuracy of parameters passed to that module.  The term has been in common use for over 30 years.  Specific best practices have been developed, for decades, to improve the handling of such parameters.

Parameter validation can be used to defend against cross-site scripting attacks.

See also
 Data validation
 Strong typing
 Error handling
 Sanity check

Notes

References
 "Parameter validation for software reliability", G.B. Alleman, 1978, webpage: ACM-517: paper presents a method for increasing software reliability through parameter validation.

Software testing